Major is a 2004 Japanese anime television series based on Takuya Mitsuda's award-winning manga series of the same name. Produced by Studio Hibari and later by SynergySP, the series aired in Japan on NHK Educational TV from November 13, 2004 to September 25, 2010.

An anime adaptation sequel of Major, Major 2nd, aired in NHK-E from April 7 to September 22, 2018.  A second season premiered on April 4, 2020. On April 25, 2020, it was announced that new episodes of second season would be delayed due to the ongoing COVID-19 pandemic. The series resumed with the fifth episode on May 30, 2020. On June 14, 2020, it went on hiatus again and the eight episode was postponed from June 20, 2020 to July 11, 2020.



Episodes

Season 1

Season 2

Season 3

Season 4

Season 5

Season 6

Film and OVAs

The Ball of Friendship

Message

World Series

Major 2nd

2nd Series Overview

2nd Season 1

2nd Season 2

Music

Television series
Season 1
 Opening (episodes 1-26): "Kokoro e (心絵 -- ココロエ)" by Road of Major (ロードオブメジャ)
 Ending (episodes 1-16): "step" by Beni Arashiro
 Ending (episodes 17–25): "Faraway" by Paradise GO!! GO!!
 Ending (episode 26): "Kokoro e (心絵 -- ココロエ)" by Road of Major

Season 2
 Opening (episodes 27–52): "Saraba Aoki Omokage (さらば碧き面影)" by Road of Major
 Ending (episodes 27–39): "WONDERLAND" by May
 Ending (episodes 40–51): "Shoboi Kao Sunnayo Baby (しょぼい顔すんなよベイベー)" by The Loose Dogs
 Ending (episode 52): "Saraba Aoki Omakage (さらば碧き面影)" by Road of Major

Season 3
 Opening (episodes 53–77): "PLAY THE GAME" by Road of Major
 Ending (episodes 53–67): "Strike Party!!!" by BeForU
 Ending (episodes 68–77): "Yoru ni Nareba" (夜になれば) by The Loose Dogs
 Ending (episode 78): "PLAY THE GAME" by Road of Major

Season 4
 Opening (episode 80-103): "RISE" by Ootomo Kouhei
 Ending (episode 79–95): "ONE DAY" by The Loose Dogs
 Ending (episode 96-103): "Ame nochi niji iro" (雨のち虹色) by The Loose Dogs feat. Maki Oguro and Showtaro Morikubo (Gorō Shigeno)
 Ending (episode 104): "Rise" by Ootomo Kouhei

Season 5
 Opening (episode 106–128): "Hey! Hey! Alright" by SCHA DARA PARR feat. Kaela Kimura
 Ending (episode 105–120): "Stay with me" by Hitomi Shimatani
 Ending (episode 121–128): "Jibun Color" (ジブンカラー) by Yu Nakamura
 Ending (episode 129):"Kokoro e (心絵 -- ココロエ)" by Road of Major

Season 6
 Opening (episode 131–153): "Kokoro e" (心絵—ココロエ) by TRIPLANE
 Ending (episode 130–142): "Twilight Star" (トワイライトスター) by Megamasso
 Ending (episode 143–153): "Zutto Mae Kara (ずっと　前から)" by French Kiss
 Ending (episode 154): "Kokoro e (心絵 -- ココロエ)" by Road of Major

Original video animations
Message
 Ending: "Kokoro e" (心絵—ココロエ) by Showtaro Morikubo

World Series
 Ending (episode 1–2): "Time capsule" (メインテーマ) by CLUTCHO

Major: Yūjō no Winning Shot
 Ending: "Tsubasa" by Remioromen

Major 2nd
2nd Season 1
 Opening (episode 1-13): "Koete Ike" (越えていけ) by Kyūso Nekokami
 Opening (episode 14–25): "Dreamcatcher" (ドリームキャッチャー) by BERRY GOODMAN (ベリーグッドマン)
 Ending (episode 1-13): "Pride" (プライド) by Yū Takahashi
 Ending (episode 14–25): "Sairen" by Reol

2nd Season 2
 Opening (episode 1-13): "Answer" by Leo Ieiri
 Ending (episode 1-13): "One" by SHE'S
 Opening (episode 14-??): "Shiroi Doro" (白い泥) by Mone Kamishiraishi
 Ending (episode 14-??): "IDENTITY" by Ame no Parade

Notes

References

Major